KRTN may refer to:

 KRTN (AM), a radio station (1490 AM) licensed to Raton, New Mexico, United States
 KRTN-FM, a radio station (93.9 FM) licensed to Raton, New Mexico, United States
 Raton Municipal Airport in Raton, New Mexico, United States
 KRTN-TV Channel 33 TV station in Durango, Colorado
 KRTN-LD (channel 18, virtual 39), a low-powered television station in Albuquerque, New Mexico